Tudar-e Ruteh (also Romanized as Tūdār-e Rūteh; also known as Tūdār-e Rūneh, Tū’ī Dartān, Tūtdār-e Rūteh, and Tu yi Dar Ruten) is a village in Kalatrazan Rural District, Kalatrazan District, Sanandaj County, Kurdistan Province, Iran. At the 2006 census, its population was 640, in 154 families. The village is populated by Kurds.

References 

Towns and villages in Sanandaj County
Kurdish settlements in Kurdistan Province